WAUC (1310 AM) is a radio station broadcasting a Real Country format. Licensed to Wauchula, Florida, USA, the station serves the Florida Heartland, includes the Hardee, Desoto and Highlands County areas, along with radio listeners in nearby Polk County and online listeners worldwide.

On August 22, 2019, WAUC began simulcasting on FM translator W271DH on frequency 102.1.

Programming
WAUC's 24-hour programming lineup blends country music from the 1970s to the 2010s, and features artists such as Blake Shelton, Brad Paisley, Merle Haggard, Willie Nelson, George Strait, Chris Stapleton, Garth Brooks, Alan Jackson, Travis Tritt, Kenny Rogers, Charley Pride, Jo Dee Messina, and more. The station also broadcasts several original live shows alongside syndicated programming.

Translators

Promotions
Starting in 2017, the station helped to strengthen a campaign to revitalize the annual Pioneer Park days events that drew income to the local Hardee County and Heartland Florida areas.  WAUC now remotely broadcasts from various community events throughout the Heartland.

In popular culture
WAUC are the call letters used for the local television station depicted in the Academy Award-winning film Rocky. Real-life news anchor/reporter Diana Lewis interviews lead character Rocky Balboa in a refrigerated meat locker operated by the fictitious Shamrock Meats Inc.

References

External links
 

AUC
Country radio stations in the United States
1958 establishments in Florida
Radio stations established in 1958